Abdul Raheem Glailati ('Abd al-Rahman Qalilat) was a renowned Sudanese poet, author and newspaper editor. He edited the newspaper Al-Ra'id (The Pioneer) between 1914 and 1917, when he was deported to Egypt after publishing an article describing the low standards of living of the Sudanese people.

Notes

References
 El-Nour, Eiman (1997) "The Development of Contemporary Literature in Sudan" Research in African Literatures 28(3) pp. 150–162, p. 151
 El-Amin, Mohammed Nuri (1986) "Britain, The 1924 Sudanese Uprising, and the Impact of Egypt on the Sudan". International Journal of African Historical Studies 19(2) pp. 235–260
 Sharkey, Heather J. (1999) "A Century in Print: Arabic Journalism and Nationalism in Sudan  1899-1999", International Journal of Middle East Studies 31. pp. 534–549

20th-century Sudanese poets
Sudanese male writers
Year of birth missing
Year of death missing
20th-century Sudanese writers